Scholtzia obovata is a shrub species in the family Myrtaceae that is endemic to Western Australia.

The shrub is found along the west coast in the Gascoyne region of Western Australia between Shark Bay and Carnarvon where it grows in sandy soils.

References

obovata
Plants described in 1843